The State Anti-Monopoly Bureau is an administrative agency under the State Council governing antitrust. The current director is Gan Lin.

History
On 15 November 2021, Gan Lin was appointed director of the State Anti-Monopoly Bureau, which was formally established on November 18.

List of directors

References 

2021 establishments in China
Government agencies established in 2021
Government agencies of China
Organizations based in Beijing